DeSales High School was a Catholic school established in 1912 in the Diocese of Rochester. It was located in the northern sector of Geneva, New York. DeSales High's mission was "to provide an academically excellent education in an intimate, faith-filled community". It was the only Catholic high school in the Finger Lakes region. DeSales closed on July 31, 2012 by the Diocese of Rochester due to financial struggles and decreasing enrollment. The final Senior class (the class of 2012) graduated in the centennial of the school.

History

Former principals
Previous assignment and reason for departure denoted within parentheses.
Rev. John Muckle–1912-1916
Rev. Francis Mason–1916-1928
Rev. Edward K. Ball–1928-1939
Rev. Raymond P. Nolan–1939-1953
Rev. Joseph Hogan–1953-1955
Rev. C. Richard Nagle–1955-1957 (Unknown, transferred to St. Thomas' Church)
Rev. John A. Morgan–1957-1958
Sr. Marie Margaret –1958-1959 (Latin/Music teacher - DeSales High School, named Vice Principal of St. Agnes High School)
Sr. Rose Adelaide–1959-1965
Sr. St. Andrew–1965-1970 (English teacher - DeSales High School, unknown)
Sr. Agnes Catherine Battersby–1970-1975 (Vice Principal - St. Agnes High School, named Pastoral Assistant of St. Patrick's Church)
Mr. Edward J. Tracey–1975-1999 (Principal - Bishop Kearney High School, retired)
Mr. Daniel E. Skinner–1999-2002 (Vice Principal - Waterloo High School, retired)
Dr. Karen M. Juliano–2002-2005 (Principal - Holy Rosary Academy, named President of Notre Dame Academy)
Rev. Joseph A. Grasso C.PP.S.–2005-2007 (Principal - Aquinas Institute, resigned)
Mr. Martin D. Cox–2007-2009 (Principal - Elma Primary School, named Superintendent/Principal of Grades PreK-4 of Fillmore Central School)
Mr. Scott C. Redding–2009  (Vice Principal - DeSales High School, named Assistant Administrator of Mynderse Academy)
Mr. Gerald J. Macaluso–2009-2012 (Interim Superintendent - Naples Central School District, retired)

Former assistant principals
Previous assignment and reason for departure denoted within parentheses.
Sr. Anacletus–1965-1969 
Sr. Louise Dolan–?-1971 (Unknown, transferred to St. Joseph's Hospital)
Sr. Rose Eileen Leary–1971-1973 (Guidance Counselor, DeSales High School, retired)
Mr. Robert Davie–1973-1975 (Dean of Students/History teacher - DeSales High School, returned to teaching)
Sr. Patricia Flass–1975-1978 (Humanities Teacher - DeSales High School, named Principal of Blessed Sacrament Junior High School, resigned)
Sr. Mary Maywalt–1978-1984 (Dean of Students - St. Agnes High School, resigned)
Mrs. Beryl A. Tracey–2001-2002 (English instructor - DeSales High School, returned to full-time teaching duties at DeSales)
Ms. Mary E. Caffrey–2002-2005 (Principal - St. Joseph School, named Principal of St. John Bosco school)
Ms. Marisa F. Capuano–2005-2007 (Special Education instructor - Aquinas Institute, resigned)
Mr. Scott C. Redding–2007-2009 (Director of Athletics/Physical Education and Biology instructor - DeSales High School, named Interim Principal of DeSales High School)

Gallery

See also
 St. Francis-St. Stephen's School
 Geneva High School

References

External links
DeSales High School website

Educational institutions established in 1912
Educational institutions disestablished in 2012
Geneva, New York
Defunct Catholic secondary schools in New York (state)
Roman Catholic Diocese of Rochester
Schools in Ontario County, New York
1912 establishments in New York (state)